Joan Collins (born 4 June 1961) is an Irish Right To Change politician who has been a Teachta Dála (TD) for the Dublin South-Central constituency since the 2011 general election.

Dublin City Council
A post office clerk by profession, Collins was elected to Dublin City Council at the 2004 local elections for the Crumlin-Kimmage local electoral area. She was involved in the Anti-Bin Tax Campaign. She is a former member of the Socialist Party, leaving with her partner, the former secretary of the party, due to a dispute with the party leadership.

Her Community and Workers Action Group joined the People Before Profit in 2007 and Collins was re-elected as a local councillor under their banner in 2009. While a Councillor Collins remained employed as a post office clerk.

As a Councillor, Collins came to prominence on 27 January 2011, when she confronted Bertie Ahern on camera as he was being interviewed outside Leinster House, on the day Ahern retired from politics with a €150,000 a year pension as wages were being cut and taxes increased, with Collins asking the former Taoiseach if he had "no shame" and "How dare you?" Ahern ignored her and dismissed her as someone who had approached him "to try get themselves on television and radio", though Collins later said she had not seen the television cameras. She released a video in which she stated she had been annoyed by "the smug smile on his face and the way he was waffling on as if he hadn't got a care in the world". A year later she said she did not regret her action against Ahern, and said that Fianna Fáil had not approached her about the incident since her election to the Dáil.

Dáil Éireann 
Collins contested the 2011 general election for the United Left Alliance, taking 12.9% of the first preference vote. She was elected on the final count without reaching the quota. She said the election should have been a referendum on the Finance Bill. In March 2011, due to the dual mandate rule, she was replaced on Dublin City Council by her party colleague Pat Dunne.

Collins committed to facilitating the nomination of Senator David Norris for a place on the ballot paper ahead of the 2011 presidential election. She said that the people of Ireland should be allowed to decide Norris's suitability for the role. On 20 September 2011, she confirmed she had signed the relevant papers.

In December 2011, she described the proposed household charge being brought in as part of the 2012 Irish budget as a "Trojan Horse". On 15 December 2011, she helped launch a nationwide campaign against the proposed household charge. In February 2012, she accompanied a collection of housing groups to Mountrath, County Laois, who successfully prevented the deputy sheriff and gardaí from evicting a man from his home. The man was ultimately evicted two weeks later, an action which Collins strongly condemned.

In December 2012, Collins named crime journalist Paul Williams and sports star Ronan O'Gara under Dáil privilege as being among those to benefit from having their penalty points cancelled by gardaí. Justice Minister Alan Shatter called Collins's action a "total disgrace" and she was reported to the Dáil Committee on Procedure and Privileges.

In April 2013, along with Clare Daly, she founded a new political party called United Left. As of December 2015, United Left is no longer on the register of political parties.

At the 2016 and 2020 general elections, she stood as an Independents 4 Change candidate, and was elected both times.

In May 2020, she left Independents 4 Change and founded a new party called Right To Change.

References

External links

 

1961 births
Living people
Independent TDs
Irish activists
Irish women activists
Irish tax resisters
Local councillors in Dublin (city)
Members of the 31st Dáil
Members of the 32nd Dáil
Members of the 33rd Dáil
People Before Profit Alliance TDs
Socialist Party (Ireland) politicians
United Left (Ireland) politicians
Independents 4 Change TDs
21st-century women Teachtaí Dála